Roger Aeschlimann (24 September 1923 – 4 May 2008) was a Swiss racing cyclist. He rode in the 1948 and 1949 Tour de France.

References

External links

1923 births
2008 deaths
Swiss male cyclists